Clausenengen Fotballklubb (CFK) is a football club located in Kristiansund, Norway. Many famous players have played at this club, including Ole Gunnar Solskjær, Øyvind Leonhardsen, Trond Andersen, Jan Erlend Kruse, Andre Flem, Arild Stavrum and Ola Lyngvær. Until 2003, the club played their home games at Atlanten Stadion.

In 2003, the two rivals Kristiansund FK and CFK agreed to establish a new elite team called Kristiansund BK. Clausenengen continued to play in lower divisions.

External links
Site of Clausenengen FK (in Norwegian)
Site of Kristiansund BK (in Norwegian)

Football clubs in Norway
Sport in Kristiansund
1921 establishments in Norway
2003 disestablishments in Norway
Association football clubs disestablished in 2003
Association football clubs established in 1921